Mount Afadja, known as Afadjato to the Ewe people of Ghana and Togo, is one of the highest mountain in Ghana. The summit is located in the Volta Region, near the border with Togo, close to the villages of Liati Wote and Gbledi Gbogame in the Afadjato South District and Hohoe Municipality, respectively.

The mountain's name is "Afadja," while the suffix "-to" in the Ewe language means mountain. The correct name in the English language, therefore, would be "Mount Afadja", as "Mount Afadjato" would be a repetition of the word "mountain". 

When the Ewe people migrated to the area and saw the mountain, it looked like the mound in which water yam is planted, water yam being called "Avadze" in Ewe. Moreover, there were some creeping plants on the mountain that resembled the water yam plant; they therefore called it "Avadze-to". Today the word has been palatalized into "Afadjato".

Mount Afadja is one of the most visited tourist attractions in the Volta Region of Ghana, welcoming thousands of visitors from around the globe annually. The nearby Tagbo Falls and Wli Falls (the highest in West Africa) are also popular tourist attractions. There are several caves, streams and other waterfalls in the area.

History 
Mount Afadja derives its name from the Ewe Word “Avadzeto” which means at war with the bush. 'Afadja' is the name of the mountain whereas 'to' in the Ewe language means mountain therefore it is called 'Afadjato' by the indigenes. The correct name would be 'Mount Afadja' as 'Mount Afadjato' will be a repetition of the 'Mountain.' The mountain is located in the Agumatsa Range near the villages of Gbledi and Liati Wote. The lush green mountains of the ridge mark the country's border with Togo.

Tourist Attractions 
The nearby Tagbo Falls and Wli Agumatsa  Waterfalls (the highest in West Africa) are also considered tourist attractions. There are several caves, streams and other waterfalls in the area. There is a plant species on the mountainsides that causes severe irritation. Shielded by the tropical forests of Ghana, the mountain provides a home to many species of flora and fauna. More than 33 species of mammals and about 300 butterfly species live in the ecological region. Also, regularly spotted in the mountains is the Mona and spotted monkeys. People often come to climb the mountain or observe the surrounding beauty.

Location 

The mountain is located in the Volta region, close to the Ghana-Togo border and Volta Lake on the east of Ghana.

References

Afadja
Volta Region
Highest points of countries